Chiquititas is a 2007 Portuguese telenovela, produced by Teresa Guilherme Produções and a version of the Argentine series Chiquititas Sin Fin. Premiered in June 2007, the show starred actress Marta Fernandes as the iconic character of Lili, an eccentric woman who guides a group of orphans while they struggle in the Do Monte Orphanage, filling their lives with joy and hope, while in the search for her lost son. Actors Nuno Pardal, Carlos Vieira, Luís Gaspar and Patrícia Tavares also star.

Plot
Madalena Santana is a cold hearted, strict and busy young woman who got pregnant in the past and, after revealing it to her father Vítor, was sent to an abandoned place. Her son was taken by the Garcia's servant, under Vítor's orders, to an orphanage, and she forced to lie by saying to Madalena that her little child was stillborn. Repentant, the servant then told Madalena the truth, which made daughter hate father since then. Madalena started looking for her child, and was sure that the kid lives inside the Do Monte Orphanage. She goes there under a new identity: with the help of her best friend Catarina, she assumes the role of an adorable and somewhat crazy woman, the sweethearted Lili. Under this alter ego, she ends up on a maternal figure to the orphans of the place, appearing as a Madalena's distant cousin. Beyond them, Lili meets Laidinha, the arrogant housekeeper who is seen by the kids as an "evil witch", the orphanage's owners Júlia and Pierre De Mont, and their little spoiled children, Marcel and Alice. The De Monts are an ambitious, greedy and perverse family aspiring for money. Lucas is the handsome, sympathetic and adorable chef of the orphanage, and he and Lily soon fall in love for each other. They both take care of Anita, Zeca, Susto, Bocas, Chico, Minorca, Kiki, Vanda, Paula and Lua (the youngest of them).
Lili gradually changes the lives of the chiquititas, while she is sure that one of them is her lost son.

Production
Chiquititas was the second Cris Morena production adapted by SIC, following the success obtained by Floribella. Before its release, the series was compared by producers to Mary Poppins, and developed a large licensed merchandise invested for the audience (as done by Floribella). Since the series finale was in September 2008, the ending had to be changed from the original one (in which the characters celebrate Christmas) to a Love-themed party.

Soundtracks
In addition to 24 Horas, Chiquititas also had a second album entitled Vida A Vida, with Portuguese versions of songs from the Chiquititas soundtracks unused in Chiquititas Sin Fin. 24 Horas was among the Portugal Albums Top 30 in first place for seven weeks.

24 Horas 

Track listing

"Chiquititas 2006" ("Chiquititas 2006")
"Coração Com Buraquinhos" ("Corazón Con Agujeritos") feat. Beatriz Monteiro
"Tudo Tudo Tudo" ("Todo Todo")
"Juntos Podemos Voar" ("Volar Mejor")
"24 Horas" ("24 Horas")
"Louco Por Ti" ("Estoy Loco") feat. Miguel Dias
"Mentiras" ("Mentiritas") 
"Há Certas Coisas" ("Me Pasan Cosas") feat. Cátia Tavares
"Malvada" ("Malissima") feat. Sofia de Portugal
"Onde Estás" ("Donde Estás") 
"Amigas" ("Amigas")
"Era Uma Vez" ("Había Una Vez")
"Eu Quero Ser Igual ("Igual A Los Demás")

Notes
Producer Miguel Dias, who adapted the themes from Spanish to Portuguese, sings alongside Marta Fernandes in the songs featuring the character of Lucas the Chef. The main title theme is incorrectly listed as "Chiquititas 2006" (the original title of the song), although it is better known as "O Mundo Das Chiquititas".

References 

Portuguese telenovelas
2007 telenovelas
2007 Portuguese television series debuts
2008 Portuguese television series endings
Sociedade Independente de Comunicação telenovelas
Portuguese-language telenovelas